Chronic vesiculobullous hand eczema presents with lesions that may be hyperkeratotic, scaling, and fissures, and the "dyshidrosiform" pattern may be recognized only during exacerbations.</ref>  Females outnumber males by 3:1, and there is a tendency for the pruritic 1- to 2-mm vesicles to be most pronounced at the sides of the fingers.

See also
Skin lesion

References

 

Eczema